Robert John Woodward (born September 28, 1962) is an American former professional baseball pitcher, who played in Major League Baseball (MLB) in parts of the 1985 through 1988 seasons, for the Boston Red Sox. Listed at 6' 3", 185 lb., he batted and threw right-handed.

Woodward spent his 11 years career in the Red Sox (1981–89) and Orioles (1990–91) systems. In his major league career, he posted a 4-4 record with a 5.04 ERA in 24 appearances, including 14 starts, giving up 68 runs (eight unearned) on 118 hits and 36 walks while striking out 45 in 100 innings pitched.

Woodward is also famous for his heated argument with Dave Winfield in 1985 after Winfield accidentally let go of his bat twice in a game and almost hit Woodward both times.

At four different minor league levels, Woodward went 81-79 with a 3.94 ERA in 345 appearances. While playing for the 1986 Pawtucket Red Sox, he pitched  consecutive scoreless innings, setting a club record that still stands today. During the 2008 season, Devern Hansack ran a string of consecutive scoreless innings to 25 for the second longest streak in the club history.

External links

Rob Woodward at Pawtucket Red Sox

Major League Baseball pitchers
Boston Red Sox players
Elmira Pioneers players
Winter Haven Red Sox players
Winston-Salem Spirits players
New Britain Red Sox players
Pawtucket Red Sox players
Rochester Red Wings players
Baseball players from New Hampshire
People from Lebanon, New Hampshire
1962 births
Living people